Carlo Speroni (13 July 1895 – 12 October 1969) was an Italian long-distance runner.

Biography
Speroni began competing at the age of 15 and took part in the 1912, 1920 and 1924 Summer Olympics. Nationally he won 12 titles: in the 5000 m (1920, 1921), 10,000 m (1914, 1920, 1921, 1924, 1925), half marathon (1912–1914) and cross country running (1913, 1915). In 1913 he set the Italian record over six miles that stood for 17 years.

In 1936 he became a masseur for the Pro Patria Calcio club, where he worked for 30 years. In 1971 the stadium Stadio Carlo Speroni was named after him.

Olympic results

See also
 Italy at the 1912 Summer Olympics
 Italy at the 1920 Summer Olympics
 Italy at the 1924 Summer Olympics

References

External links
 

1895 births
1969 deaths
Athletes (track and field) at the 1912 Summer Olympics
Athletes (track and field) at the 1920 Summer Olympics
Athletes (track and field) at the 1924 Summer Olympics
Italian male cross country runners
Italian male long-distance runners
Italian male marathon runners
Olympic athletes of Italy
People from Busto Arsizio
Olympic cross country runners
Sportspeople from the Province of Varese